Riverton is an unincorporated urban community in the Municipality of Bifrost – Riverton within the Canadian province of Manitoba that held village status prior to January 1, 2015. It is located approximately 110 kilometres north of Winnipeg. The CPR's train conductor is reputed to have named the community.

Riverton is a descriptive which replaced the earlier name, Icelandic River.  Icelandic River was named in 1875 by an Icelandic expedition as a prelude to Riverton.  Originally known as White River, it appears on Arrowsmith's map of 1821, and as White Mud on Palliser's map of 1865.

The main economy is fishing. The Freshwater Fish Marketing Corporation operates a fish-packing factory on the banks of the Icelandic River, which passes through the centre of Riverton. Other industries include agriculture and the service sector, with manufacturing being done by ECB (Erosion Control Blanket) a distant third. Being in a unique position on the west shore of Lake Winnipeg, Riverton services the northern communities via a winter road. It is on the way to Hecla-Grindstone Provincial Park and many people from Winnipeg stop in or pass by the community on the way to cottage country each summer.

Demographics 

Education
Riverton Collegiate Institute
Riverton Early Middle School

Notable people
 Reggie Leach, former professional ice hockey player 
 Gunnar Thorvaldson, Conservative senator, Senate of Canada.

Solar eclipse
Riverton was the closest community to the point of maximum totality for the solar eclipse of February 26, 1979. This total solar eclipse was part of Saros cycle 120, Series 59. Riverton hosted astronomers and eclipse chasers from across the world, providing free rooms to many of the visitors.

References

External links 

 

Designated places in Manitoba
Former villages in Manitoba
Populated places disestablished in 2015
2015 disestablishments in Manitoba
Unincorporated communities in Interlake Region, Manitoba